The Canadian men's national under-19 basketball team represents Canada in international under-18 and under-19 (under age 18 and under age 19) basketball competitions. They are overseen by Canada Basketball, the governing body for basketball in Canada.

The 2017 team won the Canadian Press Team of the Year Award, becoming the first basketball team to win the award.

A prominent member was RJ Barrett who helped his country win the 2017 FIBA Under-19 Basketball World Cup, where he became the tournament's MVP. The head coach Roy Rana in later years would become an NBA assistant coach and Head Coach of the Egyptian men's national basketball team.

Competitive record
A red box around the year indicates tournaments played within the Canada

FIBA Under-19 World Cup

See also
Canada men's national basketball team
Canada national under-17 basketball team
Canada women's national under-19 basketball team

References

External links
 Canada Basketball official website
 Archived records of Canada team participations

Men's national under-19 basketball teams
under